Pamela Meyer Davis is the president and C.E.O. of Edward Hospital in Naperville, Illinois. Her complaints in 2003 began the probe that led to the 2008 arrest of Illinois Governor Rod Blagojevich. The FBI initially laughed at her report of wrongdoing, but agreed to participate, finding widespread graft and corruption.

References

Year of birth missing (living people)
Living people
American women chief executives
American health care chief executives
American whistleblowers
21st-century American women